The 1916 Chesterton by-election was a parliamentary by-election held for the House of Commons constituency of the Chesterton or Western Division of Cambridgeshire  on 20 January 1916.

Vacancy
The by-election was caused by the re-appointment of the sitting Liberal MP, the Rt. Hon. Edwin Montagu as Chancellor of the Duchy of Lancaster. Montagu had held this post briefly in 1915 but was replaced after three months by Winston Churchill on the formation of H H Asquith’s  wartime coalition government. At that time he became Financial Secretary to the Treasury a post he had previously held in 1914-15.  He now continued to hold the post of Financial Secretary as well as that of Chancellor of the Duchy of Lancaster. However under the Parliamentary rules of the day had to resign and fight a by-election.

Candidates
Montagu was re-selected to fight the seat by his local Liberal Association and as the wartime truce between the political parties was in operation no opposing candidate was nominated against him.

The result
There being no other candidates putting themselves forward Montagu was returned unopposed.

References

See also
List of United Kingdom by-elections 
United Kingdom by-election records
1915 Chesterton by-election
1917 Chesterton by-election

1916 elections in the United Kingdom
1916 in England
20th century in Cambridgeshire
January 1916 events
By-elections to the Parliament of the United Kingdom in Cambridgeshire constituencies
Unopposed ministerial by-elections to the Parliament of the United Kingdom in English constituencies